"The Future Freaks Me Out" is a song by the pop punk band Motion City Soundtrack. It appears on the group's first album, I Am the Movie, and was released as the band's first single in Europe. "The Future Freaks Me Out" was released to radio on September 16, 2003.

The B-side for the CD single was "1000 Paper Cranes", which originally appeared on I Am the Movie (the version released by the band while unsigned) but was the only song missing for the Epitaph CD release.

The song has become a crowd favorite at Motion City Soundtrack shows. It is usually played as the band's last song and is often sung in part by the audience.

Formats and track listings
CD
 "The Future Freaks Me Out" (radio edit)
 "1000 Paper Cranes"
 "The Future Freaks Me Out" (album version) - 2:34
7" (limited to 1000 copies on picture disc)
 "The Future Freaks Me Out" - 2:34
 "My Valuable Hunting Knife (Guided by Voices cover)"

Music video
The video for "The Future Freaks Me Out" is a take on the movie Rushmore. It is set as a school play. There are many scenes depicted in it. They include the old west, an office, the ocean, a funeral and a concert. It is the second music video the band made. The guitarist Joshua Cain's family helped in the making of it, and star in it as well.

References

2003 singles
Motion City Soundtrack songs
2003 songs
Epitaph Records singles
Songs written by Joshua Cain
Songs written by Justin Pierre